Koukuntla is a village and panchayat in Devarkadra Mandal Mahabub Nagar district, Telangana, India. 4442 Population as per 2011 Census.

Devarkadra is the Nearest Town to Koukuntla. Mahbubnagar is 34 km from Koukuntla. Rail Way connectivity also in Kaukuntla.

References 

Villages in Mahbubnagar district